GR2 may refer to:

 GR2 Records, a record label
 GR2, A fictional giant robot from the 1967 manga Giant Robo

See also
Ghost Rider: Spirit of Vengeance, a 2012 sequel to the film Ghost Rider
Gravity Rush 2, a 2017 video game